Marijan Stipetić (also Mariyan or Marjan as well as the nickname Bibi; 8 December 1930 – 8 April 2011) was a Croatian swimmer who won two bronze medals at the European Championships of 1947 and 1950 for SFR Yugoslavia. He competed in the 4×200 m freestyle relay at the 1948 Summer Olympics and finished fifth with the Yugoslav team.

He was also a successful water polo player and won the Italian Championship of 1951 with the Canottieri Napoli club. In 1951, he moved to Canada after defecting from the former Yugoslavia.   Once he arrived in Canada he competed in swimming and water polo for the university of Toronto and went on to be the head coach of the Arvida swimming club "Les Ouananiches" for 17 years(1968-1985). In 1985 the family moved to Markham, Ontario, where he swam in the masters category for the Markham Masters Swimming Club. In particular, he set national records in the 400 m, 800 m and 1500 m freestyle in the age groups 70–74 and 80–84.
Stipetić held the honorary position of an Ambassador for the Croatian Olympic Committee.
He died of leukemia leaving a wife, brother and four children.

His brother, Mislav, swam with Marijan in the same 4×200 m freestyle team that won the bronze medal at the 1950 European Aquatics Championships.

References

External links
Markham Masters Swimming Club. Short Course Meters (SCM) Records – to March 2011
GENERAL COMMITTEE – COMMUNITY SERVICES & ENVIRONMENT. markham.ca

1930 births
2011 deaths
Croatian male freestyle swimmers
Swimmers at the 1948 Summer Olympics
Olympic swimmers of Yugoslavia
Croatian male swimmers
Croatian male water polo players
European Aquatics Championships medalists in swimming